The Tenzing Norgay National Adventure Award, formerly known as National Adventure Awards, is the highest adventure sports honour of Republic of India. The award is named after Tenzing Norgay, a Nepali-Indian Sherpa mountaineer and one of the first two individuals to reach the summit of Mount Everest along with Edmund Hillary in 1953. It is awarded annually by the Ministry of Youth Affairs and Sports. The recipients are honoured for their "outstanding achievement in the field of adventure activities on land, sea and air" over the previous three years. The lifetime achievement is awarded to individuals who have demonstrated excellence in and devoted themselves in the promotion of adventure sports. , the award comprises "a bronze statuette of Tenzing Norgay along with a cash prize of ".

Instituted in 1993–1994, the first awards were given for the year 1994. The stature of this award is considered to be equivalent to Arjuna Award conferred in the field of sport. Since the year 2004, this award, along with all the other six National Sports Awards, are conferred in the same presidential ceremony at the Presidential Palace, usually on 29 August each year. The nominations for a given year are accepted until 20 June. Typically, one award in each of the four categories—Land adventure, Water (Sea) adventure, Air adventure, and Lifetime achievement—are given. The number may increase in a particular year for appropriate reasons and after approval. A five-member committee evaluates the achievements of a candidate in a particular category of adventure, taking into consideration their last three years of performance for the first three categories. The committee later submits its recommendations to the Union Minister of Youth Affairs and Sports for further approval.

, there have been 146 recipients. In the first year 1994, 22 awards were given, of which 19 were bestowed on the Indian members of the 1993 Indo-Nepalese Women's Everest Expedition. In 2017, ten awards were given, of which six were given to the members of Navika Sagar Parikrama, an all-woman sailing team for the circumnavigation of the globe. Chandraprabha Aitwal is the only double recipient of the award, in 1994 for land adventure and in 2009 for lifetime achievement.

List of recipients

Explanatory notes

References

External links
 

Indian sports trophies and awards
 
Tenzing Norgay
Lists of Indian award winners